Century 21 may refer to:

 Century 21 (department store)
 Century 21 (political party)
 Century 21 (real estate)
 Century 21 Exposition, the 1962 World's Fair
 Century 21 Productions, a British TV production company

See also
 21st century (disambiguation)